Mehmet Tayfun Dingil (born 28 November 1989) is a Dutch professional footballer who plays as a centre back for Turkish club Iğdır.

Club career 
Dingil kicked off his career with amateur Blauw Geel '38 before signing for JVC Cuijk of Topklasse in 2012. In 2014, he entered fully pro football by signing for  Achilles '29 of Eerste Divisie with whom he made his professional debut.

He moved to Menemen Belediyespor in summer 2016.

References

External links 
 
 Voetbal International profile

1989 births
People from Veghel
Footballers from North Brabant
Dutch people of Turkish descent
Living people
Dutch footballers
Association football central defenders
Blauw Geel '38 players
JVC Cuijk players
Achilles '29 players
Menemenspor footballers
Hatayspor footballers
Ankara Keçiörengücü S.K. footballers
Eerste Divisie players
Derde Divisie players
TFF First League players
TFF Second League players
TFF Third League players
Dutch expatriate sportspeople in Turkey
Dutch expatriate footballers
Expatriate footballers in Turkey